Hiten Barman is an Indian politician, who was earlier with All India Forward Bloc and later joined All India Trinamool Congress in the Indian state West Bengal.

Early life
Hiten Barman, son of Maneswar and Rajabala Barman, was born on 21 June 1950 at Gopalpur in Cooch Behar district.

Educated at Mathabhanga High School, he passed Higher Secondary and Junior Basic Training, and became a teacher.

He married Kalpana in 1983 and they have two sons.

Political career
He entered politics at a young age in 1972, when he was studying at Ananda Chandra College in Jalpaiguri. Initially involved in student politics, he subsequently joined the Forward Bloc. Hailing from a peasant family he emerged as the saha-sabhapati of Mathabhanga Panchayat Samiti. In the 1996 Lok Sabha election, he contested as a candidate of the Forward Bloc (Socialist) led by Kamal Guha.  He faced defeat then but was elected to the Lok Sabha in 2004 from the Cooch Behar seat as a Forward Bloc candidate.

In 2009, the Forward Bloc refused to renominate their sitting MP. This aggrieved him and he left the party and later joined the Trinamool Congress.
In 2011, he was elected to the state assembly on a Trinamool Congress ticket from the Sitalkuchi (Vidhan Sabha constituency). He was made the Forest Minister in 2011 but was dropped in a reshuffle in 2013.

References

1950 births
All India Forward Bloc politicians
Trinamool Congress politicians from West Bengal
West Bengal MLAs 2011–2016
West Bengal MLAs 2016–2021
People from Cooch Behar district
Tripuri people
India MPs 2004–2009
Lok Sabha members from West Bengal
Living people